Drosera intricata is a scrambling or climbing perennial tuberous species in the carnivorous plant genus Drosera that is endemic to Western Australia. It grows in clay-sand soils on swamp margins, or other habitats that are seasonally wet. Its 3-12 yellow flowers emerge from September to October. It gains its species name, intricata, from its twining or winding habit.

Drosera intricata was first described and named by Jules Émile Planchon in 1848.

See also
List of Drosera species

References

Carnivorous plants of Australia
Caryophyllales of Australia
Eudicots of Western Australia
Plants described in 1848
intricata
Taxa named by Jules Émile Planchon